Cumdivock is a hamlet in Cumbria, England. Ian Caruana unearthed several 17th-century Tyneside clay pipes at Cumdivock.

References

External links
Cumbria County History Trust: Dalston (nb: provisional research only – see Talk page)

Hamlets in Cumbria
Dalston, Cumbria